Dandy Dick may refer to:

Dandy Dick (play), an 1887 stage farce by Arthur W. Pinero
Dandy Dick (film), a 1935 film adaptation of the original play